Bonnie and Clyde is a 1967 American biographical neo-noir crime film directed by Arthur Penn and starring Warren Beatty and Faye Dunaway as the title characters Clyde Barrow and Bonnie Parker. The film also features Michael J. Pollard, Gene Hackman, and Estelle Parsons. The screenplay is by David Newman and Robert Benton. Robert Towne and Beatty provided uncredited contributions to the script; Beatty produced the film. The music is by Charles Strouse.

Bonnie and Clyde is considered one of the first films of the New Hollywood era and a landmark picture. It broke many cinematic taboos and for some members of the counterculture, the film was considered a "rallying cry". Its success prompted other filmmakers to be more open in presenting sex and violence in their films. The film's ending became iconic as "one of the bloodiest death scenes in cinematic history".

The film received Academy Awards for Best Supporting Actress (Estelle Parsons) and Best Cinematography (Burnett Guffey). In 1992, it was selected for preservation in the United States National Film Registry by the Library of Congress as "culturally, historically, or aesthetically significant". It was ranked 27th on the American Film Institute's 1998 list of the 100 greatest American films of all time and 42nd on its 2007 list.

Plot
During the Great Depression, Clyde Barrow and Bonnie Parker of Texas meet when Clyde tries to steal Bonnie's mother's car. Bonnie, who is bored by her job as a waitress, is intrigued by Clyde and decides to take up with him and become his partner in crime. They pull off some holdups, but their amateur efforts, while exciting, are not very lucrative. Bonnie and Clyde turn from small-time heists to bank robbing.

The duo's crime spree shifts into high gear once they hook up with a dim-witted gas station attendant, C.W. Moss. Their exploits also become more violent. After C.W. botches parking during a bank robbery and delays their escape, Clyde shoots the bank manager in the face when he jumps onto the slow-moving car's running board. Clyde's older brother Buck and his wife, Blanche, a preacher's daughter, also join them. The two women dislike each other at first sight, and their antipathy escalates. Blanche has nothing but disdain for Bonnie, Clyde, and C.W., while Bonnie sees Blanche's flightiness as a constant danger to the gang's survival.

In Joplin, Missouri, local police drive to the hideout thinking the gang are bootleggers; two policeman are killed in a shootout. The gang is pursued by law enforcement, including Texas Ranger Frank Hamer, whom they capture and humiliate before setting him free. The five outlaws then pull a heist, during which a police chase disables their vehicle. They steal Eugene Grizzard’s car and take him and his girlfriend hostage before quickly abandoning them when they learn he is an undertaker. 

Bonnie wants to visit her family in Texas and give them part of the heist funds, to which Clyde reluctantly acquiesces despite the risk. The gang is caught off guard by an ambush by law enforcement overnight, resulting in many casualties. Buck is mortally wounded by a shot to his head, and Blanche is injured in one eye, losing sight in it. Bonnie, Clyde, and C.W. barely escape alive, while Blanche falls into police custody. Hamer then tricks her into revealing C.W.'s name (until then he was only an "unidentified suspect").

Hamer finds Bonnie, Clyde, and C.W. hiding at the house of C.W.'s father Ivan, who thinks the couple have corrupted his son (as evidenced by an ornate tattoo Bonnie convinced C.W. to get). The elder Moss strikes a bargain with Hamer: in exchange for leniency for C.W., he sets a trap for the outlaws. When Bonnie and Clyde stop on the side of the road to help Mr. Moss fix a flat tire, the police in the bushes open fire and riddle them with bullets. Hamer and his posse come out of hiding and look pensively at the couple's bodies as a nearby flock of swallows flies away.

Cast

Cast notes
Actor Gene Wilder in his film debut portrayed Eugene Grizzard, one of Bonnie and Clyde's hostages. His girlfriend Velma Davis was played by Evans Evans.

The family gathering scene was filmed in Red Oak, Texas. Several local residents gathered to watch. When the filmmakers noticed Mabel Cavitt, a local schoolteacher, among the people gathered, she was cast as Bonnie Parker's mother.

During scenes with Bonnie driving, actress Morgan Fairchild stood in for Faye Dunaway as she was unable to use the stick drive.

Production and style
The film was intended as a romantic and comic version of the violent gangster films of the 1930s, updated with modern filmmaking techniques. Arthur Penn portrayed some of the violent scenes with a comic tone, sometimes reminiscent of Keystone Kops-style slapstick films, then shifted disconcertingly into horrific and graphic violence. The film has the French New Wave directors' influence, both in its rapid shifts of tone, and in its choppy editing, which is particularly noticeable in its closing sequence. The first handling of the script was in the early 1960s. Influenced by the French New Wave writers and not yet completed, Newman and Benton sent Penn an early draft. He already was engaged in production decisions for The Chase (1966) and could not get involved in the script for Bonnie and Clyde. The writers sent their script to François Truffaut, who made contributions but passed on the project, next directing Fahrenheit 451. At Truffaut's suggestion, the writers, much excited (the film's producers were less so), approached filmmaker Jean-Luc Godard. Some sources claim Godard did not trust Hollywood and refused; Benton claimed that Godard wanted to shoot the film in New Jersey in January during the winter. He purportedly took offense when would-be producer Norah Wright objected that his desire was unreasonable, as the story took place in Texas, which has a warm climate year-round. Her partner Elinor Jones claimed the two did not believe Godard was right for the project in the first place. Godard's retort: «Je vous parle de cinéma, vous me parlez de météo. Au revoir.» ("I'm talking cinema and you're talking weather. Goodbye.") After the 1968 Academy Awards, Godard sent Benton and Newman a cable that read, "Now, let's make it all over again!"

Soon after the failed negotiations for production, Beatty was visiting Paris and learned through Truffaut of the project and its path. On returning to Hollywood, Beatty requested to see the script and bought the rights. A meeting with Godard was not productive. Beatty changed his approach and convinced the writers that while the script at first reading was very much of the French New Wave style, an American director was necessary for the subject.

Beatty offered the directing position to George Stevens, William Wyler, Karel Reisz, John Schlesinger, Brian G. Hutton, and Sydney Pollack, all of whom turned it down. Penn turned it down several times before Beatty finally persuaded him to direct the film. Beatty was entitled to 40% of the profits of the film and gave Penn 10%.

When Beatty was on board as producer only, his sister and actress Shirley MacLaine was a strong possibility to play Bonnie. When Beatty decided to play Clyde, they needed a different actress. Considered for the role were Jane Fonda, Tuesday Weld, Ann-Margret, Sharon Tate, Leslie Caron, Carol Lynley and Sue Lyon. Cher auditioned for the part, and Beatty begged Natalie Wood to play the role. Wood declined, to concentrate on her therapy, and acknowledged that working with Beatty before had been "difficult". Faye Dunaway later said that she won the part "by the skin of her teeth!"

The film is forthright in its handling of sexuality, but that theme was toned down from its conception. Originally, Benton and Newman wrote Clyde as bisexual. He and Bonnie were to have a three-way sexual relationship with their male getaway driver. Penn persuaded the writers that since the couple's relationship was underwritten in terms of emotional complexity, it dissipated the passion of the title characters. This would threaten the audience's sympathy for the characters, and might result in their being written off as sexual deviants because they were criminals. Others said that Beatty was unwilling to have his character display that kind of sexuality and that the Production Code would never have allowed such content in the first place. Clyde is portrayed as heterosexual and impotent.

Bonnie and Clyde was one of the first films to feature extensive use of squibs—small explosive charges, often mounted with bags of stage blood, that detonate inside an actor's clothes to simulate bullet hits. Released in an era when film shootings were generally depicted as bloodless and painless, the Bonnie and Clyde death scene was one of the first in mainstream American cinema to be depicted with graphic realism.

Beatty originally wanted the film to be shot in black and white, but Warner Bros. rejected the idea. Much of the studio's senior management was hostile to the film, especially Jack L. Warner, who considered the subject matter an unwanted throwback to Warner Bros.' early period, when gangster films were common product. Moreover, Warner was already annoyed at Beatty for refusing to star in PT 109 and defying Warner's favorite gesture of authority of showing the studio water tower with the WB logo on it. Beatty said, "Well, it's got your name, but it's got my initials." Warner complained about the costs of the film's extensive location shooting in Texas, which exceeded its production schedule and budget, and ordered the crew back to the studio backlot. It already had planned to return for final process shots.

Music
"Foggy Mountain Breakdown" by Flatt and Scruggs, the instrumental banjo piece, was introduced to a worldwide audience as a result of its frequent use in the movie. Its use is anachronistic because bluegrass dates from the mid-1940s rather than the 1930s. But the functionally similar old-time music genre was long established and widely recorded in the period of the film's events. Long out of print in vinyl and cassette formats, the film soundtrack was released on CD in 2009.

Historical accuracy

The film considerably simplifies the lives of Bonnie and Clyde and their gang. They were allied with other gang members, were jailed repeatedly, and committed other murders. In the part of the movie where Bonnie and Clyde escape the ambush that killed Buck Barrow and captured Blanche, Bonnie is shown being wounded by a deputy sheriff who is then killed by Clyde. In fact, although they did escape the ambush, no lawmen were killed, although between June 1933 and April 1934 the Barrow gang did kill three law officers in Texas and Oklahoma. On the run, they suffered a horrific auto accident in which Parker was severely burned and disabled. In the scene depicting Bonnie and Clyde's death, they are portrayed as having stopped their automobile, with Clyde exiting the car and then looking back at Bonnie as they realize they've been trapped, but reports state that the car was still moving when lawmen opened fire.

The sequence with Wilder and Evans is based on the Barrow gang's kidnappings of undertaker H.D. Darby and his acquaintance Sophia Stone, near Ruston, Louisiana, on April 27, 1933. They also stole Darby's car.

The film is considered to stray far from fact in its portrayal of Frank Hamer as a vengeful bungler who was captured, humiliated, and released by Bonnie and Clyde. In fact, Hamer was a decorated Texas Ranger when he was coaxed out of semi-retirement to hunt the couple down. He had never met them before he and his posse ambushed and killed them near Gibsland, Louisiana, on May 23, 1934. In 1968, Hamer's widow and son sued the movie producers for defamation of character over his portrayal; they obtained an out-of-court settlement in 1971.

In 1933, police found undeveloped film in Bonnie and Clyde's hastily abandoned hideout in Joplin, Missouri. When they printed the negatives, one showed Bonnie holding a gun in her hand and a cigar between her teeth. Its publication nationwide typed her as a dramatic gun moll. The film portrays the taking of this playful photo. It implies the gang sent photos—and poetry—to the press, but this is untrue. The police found most of the gang's items in the Joplin cache. Bonnie's final poem, read aloud by her in the movie, was not published until after her death, when her mother released it.

The only two surviving members of the Barrow Gang when the film was released in 1967 were Blanche Barrow and W.D. Jones. While Barrow had approved the depiction of her in the original script, she objected to the later rewrites. At the film's release, she complained about Estelle Parsons's portrayal of her, saying, "That film made me look like a screaming horse's ass!"

Release
The film premiered as the opening film of the Montreal International Film Festival on August 4, 1967.

At first, Warner Bros. did not promote Bonnie and Clyde for general release, but mounted only limited regional releases that seemed to confirm its misgivings about the film's lack of commercial appeal. The film quickly did excellent sustained business in select urban theatres. While Jack Warner was selling the studio to Seven Arts Productions, he would have dumped the film but for the fact that Israel, of which Warner was a major supporter, had recently triumphed in the Six-Day War. Warner was feeling too defiant to sell any of his studio's films.

Meanwhile, Beatty complained to Warner Bros. that if the company was willing to go to so much trouble for Reflections in a Golden Eye (it had changed the coloration scheme at considerable expense), their neglect of his film, which was getting excellent press, suggested a conflict of interest; he threatened to sue the company. Warner Bros. gave Beatty's film a general release. Much to the surprise of Warner Bros.' management, the film became a major box-office success.

Reception
The film was controversial at the time of release because of its apparent glorification of murderers, and for its level of graphic violence, which was unprecedented at the time. Bosley Crowther of The New York Times wrote, "It is a cheap piece of bald-faced slapstick comedy that treats the hideous depredations of that sleazy, moronic pair as though they were as full of fun and frolic as the jazz-age cutups in Thoroughly Modern Millie." He was so appalled that he began to campaign against the increasing brutality of American films. Dave Kaufman of Variety criticized the film for uneven direction and for portraying Bonnie and Clyde as bumbling moronic types. Joe Morgenstern in Newsweek initially panned the film as a "squalid shoot-'em-up for the moron trade." After seeing the film a second time and noting the enthusiastic audience, he wrote a second article saying he had misjudged it and praised the film. Warner Bros. took advantage of this, marketing the film as having made a major critic change his mind about its virtues.

Roger Ebert gave Bonnie and Clyde a largely positive review, giving it four stars out of four. He said the film was "a milestone in the history of American movies, a work of truth and brilliance." He continued, "It is also pitilessly cruel, filled with sympathy, nauseating, funny, heartbreaking, and astonishingly beautiful. If it does not seem that those words should be strung together, perhaps that is because movies do not very often reflect the full range of human life." More than 30 years later, Ebert added the film to his The Great Movies list. Film critics Dave Kehr and James Berardinelli have praised the film. Stephen Hunter, writing in Commentary in 2009, criticized the film's failure to adhere to the historical truth about Barrow, Parker, and Hamer.

The fierce debate about the film is discussed at length in the documentary For the Love of Movies: The Story of American Film Criticism (2009). This film chronicles what occurred as a result: The New York Times fired Crowther because his negative review seemed so out of touch with public opinion. Pauline Kael, who wrote a lengthy freelance essay in The New Yorker in praise of the film, was hired as the magazine's new staff critic.

The film was not expected to perform well at the box office but was a sleeper hit and by year's end had earned $2.5million in theatrical rentals in the U.S. and Canada. It continued to perform well in 1968 and by March 1968 had been in the top 12 films at the US box office for 22 weeks. By the end of 1968 it had become the studio's second highest-grossing film of all time, behind My Fair Lady, with rentals of $19 million. By July 1968, the film had earned rentals of $10 million outside of the US and Canada. Listal lists it as one of the top five grossing films of 1967, with $50.7 million in U.S. sales, and $70 million worldwide. Beatty's profit participation (which he shared with Penn) earned him over $6 million and Penn over $2 million.

Although many believe the film's groundbreaking portrayal of violence adds to the film's artistic merit, Bonnie and Clyde is still sometimes criticized for opening the floodgates to heightened graphic violence in cinema and TV. The site's consensus states: "A paradigm-shifting classic of American cinema, Bonnie and Clyde packs a punch whose power continues to reverberate through thrillers decades later."

The Japanese filmmaker Akira Kurosawa cited this movie as one of his 100 favorite films.

Awards and nominations

Media recognition 

The film repeatedly has been honored by the American Film Institute:
 1998 – AFI's 100 Years...100 Movies – #27
 2001 – AFI's 100 Years...100 Thrills – #13
 2002 – AFI's 100 Years...100 Passions – #65
 2003 – AFI's 100 Years...100 Heroes and Villains
 Clyde Barrow & Bonnie Parker – #32 Villains
 2005 – AFI's 100 Years...100 Movie Quotes
 "We rob banks." – #41
 2007 – AFI's 100 Years...100 Movies (10th Anniversary Edition) – #42
 2008 – AFI's 10 Top 10 – #5 Gangster film

In 1992, Bonnie and Clyde was selected for preservation in the United States National Film Registry by the Library of Congress as "culturally, historically, or aesthetically significant."

In 2012, the Motion Picture Editors Guild ranked the film the fifth best-edited film of all time, based on a survey of its membership.

Influence

Fifty years after its premiere, Bonnie and Clyde has been cited as a major influence for such disparate films as The Wild Bunch, The Godfather, The Departed, Queen & Slim, True Romance, and Natural Born Killers.

In popular culture
The "Storage Jars" skit of episode 33 of Monty Python's Flying Circus features a brief still shot of Beatty as Clyde firing a Thompson submachine gun as he escapes from the Red Crown Tourist Court.

In the 1994 The Simpsons episode "Grampa vs. Sexual Inadequacy", Abe and Homer are being chased and Homer remarks, "They didn't start chasing us until you turned on that getaway music." When "Foggy Mountain Breakdown" stops playing, the chase ends.

In "To Say I Love You", the second story arc of Cracker, Robbie Coltrane's character Fitz uses the death scene to first bond with, and then destroy, a murder suspect in custody: "I wept buckets. I thought it was one of the worst moments in the entire history of Hollywood. I wept buckets for all the victims, and all the families of the victims."

The music video for Beyoncé and Jay-Z's collaboration "'03 Bonnie and Clyde" is loosely inspired by the movie.

See also
 List of American films of 1967
 Heist film

Notes

References

Further reading

External links

 
 
 
 
 
 
 Bonnie and Clyde essay by Richard Schickel on the National Film Registry site.
 Bonnie and Clyde essay by Daniel Eagan in America's Film Legacy: The Authoritative Guide to the Landmark Movies in the National Film Registry, A&C Black, 2010 , pages 626 - 627 America's Film Legacy: The Authoritative Guide to the Landmark Movies in the National Film Registry
 Bosley Crowther's original review, The New York Times, April 14, 1967, and his follow-up of September 3, 1967.
 Literature on Bonnie and Clyde, Film website

1960s biographical films
1960s crime comedy-drama films
1960s crime drama films
1967 films
American biographical films
American chase films
American crime comedy-drama films
American crime drama films
American neo-noir films
American road movies
Films about Bonnie and Clyde
Crime films based on actual events
Films about bank robbery
Films directed by Arthur Penn
Films featuring a Best Supporting Actress Academy Award-winning performance
Films produced by Warren Beatty
Films scored by Charles Strouse
Films set in 1934
Films set in Iowa
Films set in Louisiana
Films set in Missouri
Films set in Oklahoma
Films set in Texas
Films shot in Texas
Films whose cinematographer won the Best Cinematography Academy Award
Films with screenplays by David Newman (screenwriter)
Films with screenplays by Robert Benton
United States National Film Registry films
Warner Bros. films
1967 drama films
Films set in a movie theatre
1960s English-language films
1960s American films